Yevgeniy Timoshenko (Yevhen Tymoshenko; born 1988, in Kharkiv) is a Ukrainian poker player. Timoshenko moved to Mukilteo, Washington when he was 8 years old. He currently resides in Seattle, Washington.

Live poker 

In April 2009, he won the season 7 World Poker Tour Championship, earning $2,149,960.

Timoshenko was previously a winner on the Asian Poker Tour in 2008, capturing a title in Macau for HK$3,812,200 (approximately US$500,000). Later in 2008, he had his first cash in the World Series of Poker, finishing in 3rd place in Event #1 in London.

At the 2011 World Series of Poker, he finished 2nd in the $25,000 No Limit Hold'em Heads-Up Championship, earning $525,980. He then finished 4th at a final table that included the eventual WSOP Main Event champion Pius Heinz at the $1,500 No Limit Hold'em event, earning himself $206,348.

At the 2013 WSOP Main Event, he finished 22nd, earning $285,408. This Result was his thus far highest ITM finish in the $10,000 No Limit Hold'em Main Event.

He also won the Aussie Millions SUPERHIGHROLLER 2014 $100,000 buy in tournament in February 2014 and thus making this tournament his biggest payday for $1,791,248.

As of February 2014, his live poker career winnings exceed $6,490,000.

Online poker 

Timoshenko plays on Full Tilt Poker under the alias of 'bballer88', while on Pokerstars he uses the screen name 'Jovial Gent'.

In 2009, he won the main event of the World Championship of Online Poker.  He bested a 2,144-player field to win $1,715,200. The same night he also won the weekly Full Tilt Poker $1,000 No Limit Holdem event for an additional $75,000.

As of July 2011, his online cashes exceed $4.7 million.

References

External links
 Cardplayer.com Profile
 Hendon Mob tournament results

1988 births
American poker players
Ukrainian emigrants to the United States
Living people
World Poker Tour winners